Kenneth C. Kauth (August 18, 1924 – January 2, 2019) was an American politician in the state of South Dakota. He was a member of the South Dakota House of Representatives from 1969 to 1978. Kauth was a businessman, owning a tire business.

References

1924 births
2019 deaths
South Dakota Democrats